Bonython may refer to:

People with the surname
 Blanche Ada Bonython, née Bray (18??–1908), first wife of Lavington Bonython
 Charles Bonython (c.1653–1705), Member of Parliament for Westminster
 Chris Bonython (born 1947), Australian amateur golfer
 Constance Jean Bonython née Warren, Lady Bonython (1891–1977), second wife of (then) Sir Lavington Bonython
 Elizabeth Bonython, Lady Wilson (1907–2008)
 John Langdon Bonython (Sir Langdon Bonython, 1848–1939), Editor, philanthropist, Australian politician and journalist
 John Langdon Bonython (1905–1992), prominent South Australian businessman
 John Lavington Bonython (Sir Lavington Bonython, 1875–1960), Australian publisher and Lord Mayor of Adelaide
 Kym Bonython (Hugh Reskymer Bonython, 1920–2011), art-dealer, author, entrepreneur, Companion of the Order of Australia
 Richard Bonython, Colonel-General of the Saco Militia (1645–?)
 Warren Bonython (Charles Warren Bonython, 1916–2012), conservationist, explorer, author and chemical engineer

Places 
 , Western Australia
 Bonython Gallery, Adelaide 
 Bonython Gallery, Sydney (Paddington)
 Bonython Hall, North Terrace, Adelaide, the Great Hall of the University of Adelaide
 Bonython Manor, an estate garden in Cornwall, England
 Bonython Park, the largest of the Adelaide Parklands
 Bonython, ACT, a suburb of Canberra
 Division of Bonython, an Australian Electoral Division in South Australia
 Eric Bonython Conservation Park, one of the protected areas of South Australia
 Mount Bonython, near Mount Lofty in the Adelaide Hills, and only 20m lower
 Port Bonython, at the head of Spencer Gulf, South Australia

Other 
 Bonython Professor of Law at the University of Adelaide